Tomás Ignacio Marchiori Carreño (born 20 June 1995) is an Argentine professional footballer who plays as a goalkeeper for Atlético Tucumán.

Career
Marchiori began his career with Gimnasia y Esgrima. He featured in two fixtures in Torneo Argentino B during the 2013–14 season, which ended with promotion to the third tier for 2014. He didn't make an appearance in either of the following three campaigns, which were spent in Torneo Federal A either side of a stint in Primera B Nacional. Sixteen appearances arrived across 2016–17 and 2017–18, the latter ended with the club being promoted back to tier two. Marchiori subsequently made his professional debut on 26 August 2018 during a 2–1 victory over Temperley.

On 2 October 2020, Marchiori joined Atlético Tucumán on loan until the end of 2021. At the end of December 2021, Atlético Tucumán bough him free and signed him on a permanent contract.

Career statistics
.

References

External links

1995 births
Living people
Sportspeople from Mendoza Province
Argentine people of Italian descent
Argentine footballers
Association football goalkeepers
Torneo Argentino B players
Torneo Federal A players
Primera Nacional players
Gimnasia y Esgrima de Mendoza footballers
Atlético Tucumán footballers